Yang Yixuan (born 30 June 2001) is a Chinese footballer currently playing as a left winger for Hebei.

Club career
Yang Yixuan was promoted to the senior team of Hebei within the 2021 Chinese Super League season and would make his debut in a Chinese FA Cup game on 14 October 2021 against Shaanxi Chang'an Athletic in a 1-0 defeat. This would be followed by his first league appearance on 26 December 2021 against Shandong Taishan in a 2-0 defeat.

Career statistics
.

References

External links
 

2001 births
Living people
Chinese footballers
Association football midfielders
Chinese Super League players
Hebei F.C. players